Naftna Industrija Srbije (abbr. NIS / НИС) is a Serbian multinational oil and gas company with headquarters in NIS building, Novi Sad, Serbia. NIS is one of the most profitable companies in Serbia and one of the largest domestic exporters. It employs around 11,000 people in Serbia and the region. As of May 2022, Gazprom Neft is the largest shareholder with 50% of NIS shares, followed by 29.87% owned by the Government of Serbia, 5% owned by Gazprom and rest by minority shareholders.

The main activities of the company are exploration, production and refining of petroleum and natural gas, sales and distribution of a broad range of petroleum and gas products, as well as the implementation of energy and petrochemical projects. The main NIS production facilities are in the Republic of Serbia, while subsidiaries and representative offices have been established in Bosnia and Herzegovina, Bulgaria, Romania, Russia and Angola.

History

The precursor of today's NIS was the "Oil Exploration and Production Company" with headquarters in Zrenjanin, founded in 1949 by the decision of the government of the Federal People's Republic of Yugoslavia (FPRY). The "Company for Oil Exploration and Production Naftagas" was established in 1953 pursuant to the decision of the government of FPRY, when management was relocated to Novi Sad. During the 1950s, first petrol stations and warehouses in this area were opened. Oil refineries in Pančevo and Novi Sad were put into operation in 1968. At the end of 1973, sales and distribution organizations "Jugopetrol-Beograd" and "Jugopetrol-Novi Sad" were integrated into the company.

Naftna industrija Srbije (NIS), in its present form, was established in 1991 as a public company for the exploration, production, refining and sales and distribution of oil, petroleum products and natural gas. The company gave rise to three present-day companies: NIS, Srbijagas, and "Transnafta". In October 2005, NIS was transformed into a joint-stock company, appointing its own Shareholders’ Assembly, Board of Directors and other managing bodies.

In 2008, the Russian company Gazprom Neft became the majority shareholder, pursuant to the "Sales and Purchase Agreement" between the Republic of Serbia and the Russian Federation on the purchase of 51% of shares for €400 million and €550 million in investments until 2012. Adjoining contracts signed with Gazprom were about inclusion of Serbia in the South Stream gas-pipeline project and the construction of an underground gas storage facility in Banatski Dvor. On 24 December 2008, final contract between the Government of Serbia and Gazprom were signed.

In January 2010, about 20% of remaining shares of NIS were distributed by the Serbian government to the Serbian citizens. In June 2010, NIS was transformed into an open joint-stock company, and is listed on the Belgrade Stock Exchange since 30 August 2010. In March 2011, Gazprom Neft announced that it will purchase an additional 5.15% of shares of NIS, increasing their original share from 51% to 56%. NIS held a monopoly on all oil imports in Serbia until 2011.

In accordance with its strategy of becoming a regional leader, in 2011 NIS started to expand its business rapidly in the region. Subsidiary companies were established in Bosnia and Herzegovina, Bulgaria, Hungary and Romania.

In 2012 the construction of hydrocracking and hydrotreatment facilities (MHC/DHT) was completed in Pančevo Oil Refinery, marking the completion of the first stage of modernization of NIS refining facilities.

Two years later, in 2013, the realization of the cogeneration project began (production of electric and thermal energy from gas obtained from oil and gas fields in Serbia). The first cogeneration facility was commissioned in Sirakovo, after which another 13 mini power plants were put into operation. The surplus of electric energy, produced by NIS, is since then sold on the free market. The company strives towards constant implementation of new technologies, thus in 2016 an Amin Plant for the purification of natural gas started operating within the Plant for the preparation and transport of oil and gas in Elemir. The second stage of the Pančevo Oil Refinery modernization has begun in 2017 with the construction of the bottom-of-the-barrel plant with delayed coking technology, with the intent to make Pančevo Oil Refinery one of the most modern in Eastern Europe. In May 2022, the ownership structure was changed, with Gazprom Neft transferring 6.15% of shares to Gazprom, to avoid western sanctions on oil embargo introduced as reaction to the 2022 Russian invasion of Ukraine.

Operations

Exploration and production
NIS is the only company in Serbia which deals with exploration and production of crude oil and gas, as well as with production of geothermal energy. The company disposes with all necessary equipment for the performance of a whole range of complex activities such as geophysical exploration, control of production of crude oil, gas and geothermal energy. The majority of NIS oil fields are located on the territory of Serbia, in the province of Vojvodina, but upstream has business operations both in Serbia and abroad. In 2011 NIS started to expand business in south-east Europe: in Bosnia and Herzegovina, Romania and Hungary.

Energy 
NIS is engaged in the production of electrical and thermal energy from traditional and renewable resources, the production and sale of compressed natural gas, sale of natural gas, trade of electrical energy, development and implementation of strategically important energy projects, as well as the projects for improving energy efficiency. In terms of electric energy trade, NIS is present on the markets of Serbia, Bosnia and Herzegovina, Romania, Slovenia and Hungary, as well as North Macedonia.

Refining
The company owns and operates oil refineries in Pančevo (annual capacity of 4.8 million tons of crude oil) and Novi Sad (annual capacity of 2.6 million tons of crude oil), and natural gas refinery in Elemir. NIS refining complex produces a whole range of petroleum products – from motor gasoline and diesel fuel to mechanical lube oils and feedstock for the petrochemical industry, heavy fuel oil, road and industrial bitumen, etc.

Pančevo Oil Refinery produces motor fuel in accordance with Euro 5 standard, aviation fuel, liquid petroleum gas, petrochemical products, fuel oil, bitumen and other petroleum products. In 2017, Pančevo Oil Refinery was the first Serbian energy company to obtain the IPPC certificate (integrated certificate) from the state authorities on the integrated pollution prevention and control, confirming that the production process in the Refinery is fully compliant with the highest domestic and European standards in environmental protection.

NIS also offers services of crude refining to third parties.

Sales and distribution

Sales and distribution in NIS includes foreign and domestic trade, retail of petroleum and other related products, as well as the wholesale of petroleum products. NIS develops aviation fuel supply, bunkering, lubricants and bitumen sale and distribution as separate businesses. As of 2019, NIS has two retail brands on the market: NIS Petrol (mass consumption brand) and GAZPROM (premium brand).

In 2010 NIS started a program of modernization of the retail network. First re-branded gas station "Zmaj 2" with the brand NIS Petrol on the highway in Belgrade was opened 13 January 2012. In November 2012, NIS acquired 100% of OMV subsidiary operations in Bosnia and Herzegovina and its network of 28 filling stations.

In December 2012, NIS opened the first petrol station under the Gazprom brand in Serbia, and subsequently in Romania (the same month), and in Bulgaria (in July 2013). As of 31 December 2016, NIS with 324 filling stations was the largest petroleum company in Serbia in terms of market network.

As of 2019, NIS owns the largest network of filling stations in Serbia – a total of 297 filling stations, including loading terminals, LPG bottle shops, warehouses, aviation fuel pumping facility at Belgrade Nikola Tesla Airport and a network of depots across Serbia. Retail network for LPG retail includes all the regional sales centers in major cities in the country.

Services
NIS has its own service capacities which fully meet the company's needs and can render services to third parties. NIS provides services by means of subsidiary companies "NAFTAGAS-Oilfield Services", "NAFTAGAS-Technical services" and "NAFTAGAS-Transport".

Market and financial data
Naftna Industrija Srbije finished the 2018 calendar year as the third biggest Serbian gross exporter with 465 million euros worth of exports. As of 8 March 2019, Naftna Industrija Srbije has a market capitalization of 987.50 million euros.

Corporate social responsibility
The company has defined several social responsibility corporate programs: 
 Energy of Sport – NIS has sponsored several sports teams in Serbia including: OK Vojvodina, KK Partizan, Serbia Davis Cup team, Children's mini-basket league, clubs supported by NIS Unions where employees are involved, and others.
 Culture Without Borders, which supports cultural institutions, national and international festivals and projects of Russian-Serbian cooperation. NIS cooperates with the Belgrade Philharmonic Orchestra, FEST (Belgrade), Guča Trumpet Festival, Nisville Jazz festival, Sterijino Pozorje Festival, Zmaj Children's Games, and the Joy of Europe Festival.
 Science and Talent Development program, which supports the development of scientific potential research, scientific discoveries, development of talented pupils and students. NIS supports Petnica Science Center and cooperates with University of Belgrade and University of Novi Sad. Cooperation includes student scholarships, internships at the company, additional specialization of company employees, gaining new know-how, and realization of mutual scientific research projects.
 Charity projects, which includes help to the most disadvantaged categories of citizens, one-time assistance to the injured, assistance to small organizations and associations which have good ideas but lack of funding, fuel donations in charity programs, etc. Some charity projects NIS has supported include construction of the Safe House in Pančevo, support for renovation of Hilandar monastery and help in the form of 100 litres of drinking water Jazak to the city of Kraljevo (Serbia) after the devastating 2010 Serbia earthquake.
 Cooperation for Development, which is implemented in regions NIS does business in. Agreements are signed in the following cities: Novi Sad, Belgrade, Niš, and with municipalities and cities in Vojvodina: Pančevo, Kikinda, Zrenjanin, Kanjiža, Novi Bečej.

NIS published its first sustainability report for 2010. NIS was the first company in Serbia to publish this report in accordance with the world standards Global Reporting Initiative (GRI-G3) and AA1000 APS (2008).

Controversies
In 2012, NIS was accused by the Naftagas Union of mismanaging employees by forcing furloughs on some employees and keeping others as employees while not allowing them to work.

See also

 NIS building

References

External links

 
 NIS Petrol website
 Gazprom Petrol websites in the region
 NIS profile on the Foreign Investors Council website

Companies based in Novi Sad
Energy companies established in 1991
Economy of Vojvodina
NIS
Serbian brands
Serbian companies established in 1991
Chemical companies of Serbia